Nellikuth (also Nellikuthu) is a town in Manjeri Municipality in Malappuram district of Kerala, India. It is situated 8 km west to Manjeri and 16 km north west to the Malappuram, the district headquarters. It is one of the major place in Payyanad Village, in Eranad Taluk.

History
Nellikuth is the birthplace of Ali Musliyar and Variyan Kunnath Kunjahammed Haji, the Moplah rebel leaders of 1921 Malabar Rebellion. This place is 8 km far from manjeri town.

Geography
Mukkam, Palathingal, Kottakuth is some areas within the village. A part of Kadalundi river flows through the village.

Culture
Nellikkuth village has been a multi-ethnic and multi-religious village since the medieval period. The Muslims form the largest religious group followed by Hindus and Christians. The cultural tradition of the village reflects the folk arts of different communities. Duff Muttu, Kadhaprasangam, Kolkali and Aravanamuttu are common folk arts of this locality. The mosques in Nellikuth also been functioned as madrasa and libraries giving a rich source of Islamic studies. Most of the books are written in Arabi-Malayalam which is a version of the Malayalam language written in Arabic script. The Hindu community of this area keeps rich traditions by celebrating various festivals in temples. Hindu rituals are a regular devotion like other parts of Kerala.

Transportation
The manjeri - melattur road connects the village to nearby areas. The nearest town is Manjeri. The areas are well connected within the villages by municipality roads.

Civic administration 
The village is governed by Manjeri municipality. Nellikuth village is composed of three wards.

Important institutions

Education 
The village has Government Muslim Lower Primary School and Government Vocational Higher Secondary School. Other than these government backed schools, some private educational institutions also has been established to cater the educational needs of the village.

Healthcare 
Government has established local public health care in village. There has other private clinics to serve the population.

Notable people 

 Ali Musliyar - Freedom activist.
 Variyan Kunnathu Kunjahammed Haji - Indian Freedom Fighter.

References

Manjeri